Elanthakuttai (எலந்தகுட்டை) is a village located in Komaraplayam Taluk of Namakkal district, Tamil Nadu, India, on the bank of the Kaveri River. It is located in between Sankari and Pallipalayam in Kongu Nadu region.

Villages in Namakkal district